Sia is an Australian singer. She has released nine studio albums: OnlySee (1997), Healing Is Difficult (2002), Colour the Small One (2004), Some People Have Real Problems (2008), We Are Born (2010), 1000 Forms of Fear (2014), This Is Acting (2016), Everyday Is Christmas (2017) and Music – Songs from and Inspired by the Motion Picture (2021). She released the live album Lady Croissant in 2007, and her greatest hits album Best Of... was released in Australia in 2012.

In 2002, Sia received the Breakthrough Songwriter Award from the APRA Music Awards, presented by the Australasian Performing Right Association. Since then, Sia has been nominated for three People's Choice Awards, two Brit Award, four World Music Awards, and two Golden Globe Awards. She has won three NRJ Awards, one MTV Video Music Award, ten ARIA Music Awards, and ten APRA Music Awards.

Sia has received a total of nine Grammy Award nominations. "Chandelier" was nominated for Record and Song of the Year at the 2015 ceremony.

Antville Music Video Awards

The Antville Music Video Awards are online awards for the best music video and music video directors of the year. They were first awarded in 2005.

!
|-
| 2008
| "Soon We'll Be Found"
| Best Choreography
| 
|
|-
|rowspan=3|2014
|rowspan=3|"Chandelier"
| Video of the Year
| 
| style="text-align:center;" rowspan="3"|
|-
| Best Choreography
| 
|-
| Best Art Direction
| 
|}

AIR Awards 

!
|-
|rowspan=3|AIR Awards of 2009
|rowspan=2|Sia
|Best Independent Artist
| 
| 
|-
|Breakthrough Independent Artist
| 
|
|-
| "Buttons"
| Best Independent Single/EP
| 
|
|-
|rowspan=3|AIR Awards of 2010
|Sia
|Best Independent Artist
| 
| 
|-
| We Are Born
|Breakthrough Independent Album
| 
|
|-
|  "Clap Your Hands"
| Best Independent Single/EP
| 
|
|-
|rowspan=3|AIR Awards of 2014
||Sia
|  Best Independent Artist
| 
| style="text-align:center;" rowspan="3"|
|-
||"Chandelier"
|  Best Independent Single/EP
| 
|-
||"1000 Forms of Fear"
|  Best Independent Album
| 
|}

Aice Awards 

!
|-
||2017
||The Greatest
|  Color Grading – Music Video
| 
| style="text-align:center;" rowspan="3"|
|-

APRA Music Awards

The APRA Music Awards are presented by the Australasian Performing Right Association (APRA). The awards recognise achievements by APRA's "outstanding songwriter, composer and publisher members in Popular Contemporary, Art Music and Screen Music". Nominations and winners are determined by the more than 60,000 eligible voting members of APRA, by members of its board, or by "APRA based statistical analysis". According to APRA, the Song of the Year award is the only "peer voted" music honor in Australia. Sia has received eleven awards from twenty-four nominations. In March 2015 she won 'Best Songwriter' for the third year in a row – the first artist to do so, which Brett Cottle (APRA AMCOS CEO) described as "unprecedented, and very likely, a never-to-be-repeated achievement by one of our most talented songwriters."

ARIA Music Awards
The Australian Recording Industry Association Music Awards are awarded annually by the Australian Recording Industry Association (ARIA). Sia has received ten awards from thirty-one nominations.

ASCAP Pop Music Awards 
The American Society of Composers, Authors and Publishers (ASCAP) presents a series of annual awards shows in seven different music categories: pop, rhythm and soul, film and television, Latin, country, Christian, and concert music. Sia has received 6 awards

|-
!scope="row" rowspan="3"|2013
|"Diamonds" (by Rihanna)
| rowspan="3" | Most Performed Songs
|
|-
|"Wild Ones" (with Flo Rida)
|
|-
|"Let Me Love You" (by Ne-Yo)
|
|-
!scope="row" rowspan="1"|2017
|"Cheap Thrills"
|Most Performed Songs
|
|-
!scope="row" rowspan="2"|2018
|"Cheap Thrills" (feat. Sean Paul)
| rowspan="2" |Most Performed Songs
|
|-
|"The Greatest"  (feat. Kendrick Lamar)
|
|}

Billboard Music Awards
The Billboard Music Awards honor artists for commercial performance in the U.S., based on record charts published by Billboard. The awards are based on sales data by Nielsen SoundScan and radio information by Nielsen Broadcast Data Systems. The award ceremony was held from 1990 to 2007, until its reintroduction in 2011. Sia has received six nominations.

BMI Awards
The BMI Awards are held annually by Broadcast Music, Inc. to award songwriters in various genres, including country and pop.

BMI London Awards

!
|-
!scope="row" rowspan="3"|2013
|"Titanium" (with David Guetta)
| Dance Award
| 
| style="text-align:center;" rowspan="3"|
|-
|"Wild Ones" (with Flo Rida)
|Award-Winning Songs
| 
|-
|"Titanium" (with David Guetta)
|Award-Winning Songs
| 
|}

BMI Pop Awards

!
|-
!scope="row" rowspan="3"|2013
|"Titanium" (with David Guetta)
|Award-Winning Songs
| 
|
|-
|"Wild Ones" (with Flo Rida)
|Award-Winning Songs
| 
|
|}

Brit Awards
First awarded in 1977, the Brit Awards are sponsored by MasterCard. Sia has been nominated twice.

Camerimage 
The International Film Festival of the Art of Cinematography Camerimage is a festival dedicated to the celebration of cinematography and recognition of its creators, cinematographers. The first seven events (1993–1999) were held in Toruń, Poland. The next ten events (2000–2009) were held in Łódź. Since 2010, the festival has taken place in Bydgoszcz. In 2007, the name of the festival was changed from Camerimage to Plus Camerimage but was changed back in 2013 after the sponsorship deal with Plus ended. At the end of November every year, Camerimage brings together professional cinematographers, students and other people associated with the film industry. The Camerimage festival spans over a course of one week, with multiple events at one time. Sia has been nominated two times.

|-
|rowspan=2|2014
|rowspan=2|"Chandelier"
|Best Music Video
|
|-
| Best Cinematography in a Music Video
|
|}

Cannes Lions International Festival of Creativity 

|-
||2017
||"The Greatest"
|  Excellence in Music Video
| 
|}

Capri Hollywood International Film Festival

Clio Awards 
The Clio Awards is an annual award program that recognizes innovation and creative excellence in advertising, design and communication, as judged by an international panel of advertising professionals. Sia has received six awards.

|-
!scope="row" rowspan="3"|2015
|rowspan="2"| Chandelier
|Best Music Video
|
|-
|Best Innovative
|
|-
|rowspan| 1000 Forms of Fear
|Best Album Campaign
|
|-
!scope="row"|2017
|The Greatest
|Best Music Video
|
|-
!scope="row" rowspan="2"|2019
|rowspan="1"| LSD: The Experience, The Game, The Album
|Best Album Campaign
|
|-
|rowspan="1"| LSD: The Game
|Games/Contests
|
|}

Critics' Choice Documentary Awards

|-
||2016
||"Angel by the Wings"
|  Best Song in a Documentary
| 
|}

D&AD Awards 
Design and Art Direction (D&AD, formerly known as British Design & Art Direction) is a British educational charity which exists to promote excellence in design and advertising.

|-
|rowspan=2|2015
|rowspan=2|"Chandelier"
|  Music Videos
| 
|-
| Direction for Music Videos
| 
|}

Dorian Awards
The Dorian Awards are organized by the Gay and Lesbian Entertainment Critics Association (GALECA). Sia has won once.

!
|-
!scope="row"|2015
|"Chandelier"
|Music Video of the Year
|
|
|}

Echo Music Prize 
The Echo Music Prize was created in 1992 by the Deutsche Phono-Akademie. Sia has received one award from two nominations.

!
|-
!scope="row" rowspan="2"|2017
|Sia
|International Female Artist
|
|style="text-align:center;" rowspan="2"|
|-
|"Cheap Thrills"
|Hit of the Year
|
|}

Fryderyk
The Polish Society of the Phonographic Industry (ZPAV), which presents the annual Fryderyk, seen as the Polish equivalent of the Grammys, also honours one Polish and one foreign song the title of Digital Single of the year, denoting the best selling single of that year.

!
|-
| 2017
| "Chandelier"
| International Digital Song of the Year
| 
|style="text-align:center;"|
|-

GAFFA Awards

GAFFA Awards (Denmark) 
Delivered since 1991. The GAFFA Awards (Danish: GAFFA Prisen) are a Danish award that rewards popular music awarded by the magazine of the same name.

|-
!scope="row"| 2010
|rowspan="3"| Sia
| International Female Artist of the Year
|
|-
!scope="row"| 2014
| International Female Artist of the Year
|
|-
!scope="row"| 2016
| International Female Artist of the Year
|
|}

Gaygalan Awards
Since 1999, the Gaygalan Awards are a Swedish accolade presented by the QX magazine.

!
|-
!scope="row"|2017
|The Greatest
|International Song of the Year
|
|style="text-align:center;"|
|-
|}

GLAAD Media Awards
The GLAAD Media Awards were created in 1990 by the Gay & Lesbian Alliance Against Defamation to "recognize and honor media for their fair, accurate and inclusive representations of the LGBT community and the issues that affect their lives." Sia has been nominated once.

!
|-
!scope="row"|2017
|Sia
|Outstanding Music Artist
|
|style="text-align:center;"|
|}

Global Awards

!
|-
!rowspan="2" scope="row"|2018
|rowspan="3" |Sia
|Best Female
|
|rowspan="2" style="text-align:center;"|
|-
|Mass Appeal Award
|
|-
!rowspan="1" scope="row"|2019
|Mass Appeal Award
|
|rowspan="1" style="text-align:center;"|
|-
|}

Gold Derby Awards
The Gold Derby Awards (or Gold Derby TV and Film Awards) are awards given by the website Goldderby.com for television and film. Sia has been nominated once.

Golden Globe Awards

The Golden Globe Awards were established in 1944 by the Hollywood Foreign Press Association to celebrate the best in film and television. Sia has been nominated twice.

Golden Raspberry Awards

Grammy Awards

The Grammy Awards are awarded annually by the National Academy of Recording Arts and Sciences of the United States for outstanding achievements in the record industry. Often considered the highest music honour, the awards were established in 1958. Sia has been nominated nine times.

Guild of Music Supervisors Awards
The Guild of Music Supervisors Awards recognize music supervisors in 14 categories, representing movies, television, games and trailers.

Hollywood Music in Media Awards
The Hollywood Music in Media Awards (HMMA) recognizes and honors the music of visual mediums (films, TV, movie trailers, video games, commercials, etc.). Sia has been nominated two times.

!
|-
!scope="row" rowspan=2|2016
|"Try Everything" (as songwriter)
|Best Original Song – Animated Film
|
|-
|"Sledgehammer" (as songwriter)
|Best Original Song – Sci-Fi/Fantasy Film
|
|}

iHeartRadio Much Music Video Awards

|-
|rowspan=2|2015
|rowspan=2|"Chandelier"
|Best International Artist
|
|-
|Most Buzzworthy International Artist or Group
|
|-
|rowspan=2|2016
|rowspan=2|"Cheap Thrills"
|Best International Artist
|
|-
|Most Buzzworthy International Artist or Group
|
|}

iHeartRadio Music Awards
The iHeartRadio Music Awards is a music awards show, founded by iHeartRadio in 2014, to recognize the most popular artists and music over the past year as determined by the network's listeners. Sia has been nominated four times.

Industry Dance Music Awards
The Industry Dance Awards & Cancer Benefit Show is an annual event that brings the global dance community together in celebration of creativity, industry innovation, and the fight against cancer.

|-
! scope="row"|2015
| Dancing with the Stars (Season 20 Finale) – Sia's "Elastic Heart"
| America's Favorite Performance
|
|}

International Dance Music Award
The International Dance Music Awards were established in 1985. It is a part of the Winter Music Conference, a weeklong electronic music event held annually. Sia has won once and been nominated seven times.

|-
!scope="row" rowspan="2"|2013
| "Titanium" (with David Guetta)
| Best Commercial Pop/Dance Track
|
|-
| "Wild Ones" (with Flo Rida) 
|Best Rap/Hip Hop Dance Track
|
|-
!scope="row" rowspan="3"|2015
| rowspan="2"| "Chandelier
| Best Commercial Pop/Dance Track
|
|-
|Best Music Video
|
|-
| Herself
| Best Artist (Solo)
|
|-
!scope="row" rowspan="2"|2016
| Herself
| Best Artist (Solo)
|
|-
| Déjà Vu (with Giorgio Moroder)
| Best Featured Vocalist Performance
|
|}

International Music Video Festival

|-
! scope="row"|2014
| Chandelier
| Prix de la réalisation
|
|}

J Award
The J Awards were established by influential Australian youth radio station Triple J in 2005. The annual series of awards are judged by the music and on-air teams at triple j, Triple J Unearthed and Double J, while rage is a "co-presenter" (filling the void left by the former triple j tv). Sia has received one award from two nominations.

|-
! scope="row"|2010
| We Are Born
| Australian Album of the Year
| 
|-
! scope="row"|2014
| Chandelier
| Australian Music Video of the Year
|
|}

Juno Awards
The Juno Awards are presented annually to Canadian musical artists and bands to acknowledge their artistic and technical achievements in all aspects of music. Sia has been nominated once.

!
|-
! scope="row"| 2017
| This Is Acting
| International Album of the Year
| 
| style="text-align:center;"|
|}

Latin American Music Awards

LOS40 Music Awards
The LOS40 Music Awards (formerly Los Premios 40 Principales) is an annual awards organized by Spanish music radio Los 40 Principales. Sia has won three awards out of ten nominations.

MAD Video Music Awards
The VMA is an annual awards show that air on the MAD TV (Greece). The awards honor the year's biggest achievements in music, voted by the viewers of Mad television. Winners receive an authentic Mad designed award with the graphics of that year's show. Sia has been nominated once.

|-
!scope="row"| 2015
| "Chandelier"
| MAD Radio 106.2 Song of the Year
| 
|}

MTV Awards

MTV Australia Music Awards
The MTV Australia Awards was an annual awards ceremony established in 2005 by MTV Australia. Sia has received one nomination.

|-
|2009
|Sia
|Independent Spirit
|

MTV Europe Music Awards
The MTV Europe Music Awards ("EMAs", originally MTV European Music Awards) were established in 1994 by MTV Networks Europe to celebrate the most popular songs and singers in Europe. Originally beginning as an alternative to the American MTV Video Music Awards, the MTV Europe Music Awards is today a popular celebration of what MTV worldwide viewers consider the best in music. Sia has been nominated seven times.

MTV Video Music Awards
The MTV Video Music Awards are awarded annually by MTV for outstanding music videos. Sia has received one award from eight nominations.

MTV Video Music Awards Japan
The MTV Video Music Awards Japan are the Japanese version of the MTV Video Music Awards. Sia has received three nominations.

MTV Platinum Video Plays Awards

MTV Italia Awards 
Firstly called TRL Awards, since 2012 it is presented by MTV Italy changing the name in MTV Italian Music Awards. Sia received 4 nomination.

mtvU Woodie Awards
The mtvU Woodie Awards were created by MTV in 2004 to recognize best in music as voted by college students. Sia has been nominated twice.

|-
!scope="row" rowspan=2 | 2015
|"Drunk in Love"
|Best Cover Woodie
|
|-
| Sia
|Next Level Performance Woodie
|
|}

Music Video Production Awards
The MVPA Awards are annually presented by a Los Angeles-based music trade organization to honor the year's best music videos.

|-
! rowspan="2" |2008
| "Day Too Soon"
| Best Direction of a New Artist 
| 
|-
| "Buttons"
| Best Direction of a Female Artist
| 
|-
!|2013
|  "She Wolf (Falling To Pieces)"
| Best Electronic Video
|

Nickelodeon Kids' Choice Awards 
The Nickelodeon Kids' Choice Awards are annual award shows launched by Nickelodeon in several countries.

Nickelodeon Australian Kids' Choice Awards

|-
!|2018
| Sia
| Favourite Streaming Sensation
| 
|}

NME Awards
The NME Awards is an annual music awards show in the United Kingdom, created by the music magazine NME and was first held in 1953. Sia has been nominated once.

!
|-
!scope="row"| 2017
| Sia
| Best International Female
| 
| style="text-align:center;"|
|}

NRJ Music Awards
The NRJ Music Awards were created in 2000 by the radio station NRJ in partnership with the television network TF1. Sia has received three awards from six nominations.

People's Choice Awards
The People's Choice Awards is an annual awards show. Sia has been nominated three times.

PETA Libby Awards

Robert Awards
The Robert Award is a Danish film prize awarded each year by the Danish Film Academy. It is the Danish equivalent of the American Oscars, British BAFTAs for films and Australian AACTA Awards. The award, voted only by academy members, is acknowledgement by Danish industry colleagues of a person's or film's outstanding contributions during the previous year. The Robert was awarded for the first time in 1984 and is named after the statuette's creator, the Danish sculptor Robert Jacobsen. Sia has been nominated once.

|-
!scope="row"| 2016
| "Waving Goodbye"
| Best Song
| 
|}

Rockbjörnen
Rockbjörnen is a music awards in Sweden, divided into several categories, which is awarded annually by the newspaper Aftonbladet. The prize was first awarded in 1979, and is mostly centered on pop and rock. Sia has received 1 nomination.

Rolling Stone Australia Awards
The Rolling Stone Australia Awards were created in 2010 by Rolling Stone (Australia) magazine for outstanding contributions to popular culture in the previous year. Sia has received one award from two nominations.

RTHK International Pop Poll Awards
The RTHK International Pop Poll Awards is an annual award show presented at RTHK Studio 1 that honors the best in international and national music established in 1989. Sia has received 6 nominations.

|-
! scope="row" rowspan="2" |2015
|"Chandelier"
|Top Ten International Gold Songs
|
|-
|Sia
|Top Female Artist
|
|-
! scope="row" rowspan="2" |2016
|"Alive"
|Top Ten International Gold Songs
|
|-
|Sia
|Top Female Artist
|
|-
! scope="row" rowspan="2" |2017
|"The Greatest"
|Top Ten International Gold Songs
|
|-
|Sia
|Top Female Artist
|
|}

Soul Train Music Awards
The Soul Train Music Awards is an annual award show which previously aired in national television syndication, and honours the best in Black music and entertainment. It is produced by the makers of Soul Train, the program from which it takes its name.

Swiss Music Awards
The Swiss Music Awards, the most important music awards in Switzerland, were created to promote national music scene and at the same time present its cultural diversity. Sia has been nominated two times.

|-
!scope="row" rowspan=2|2017
|"Cheap Thrills" (featuring Sean Paul)
|Best Hit International
|
|-
|Herself
|Best Act International
|
|}

Teen Choice Awards 
The Teen Choice Awards is a teen awards show presented annually by Fox. The program honors the year's biggest achievements in music, movies, sports, television, fashion and more, as voted on by teens aged 13–19. Sia has been nominated twice.

!
|-
!scope="row"| 2012
| "Wild Ones" (Flo Rida featuring Sia)
| Choice Music: R&B/Hip-Hop Song
| 
| style="text-align:center;"|
|-
!scope="row"| 2016
| "Cheap Thrills"  (featuring Sean Paul) 
| Choice Music: Party Song
| 
| style="text-align:center;"|
|}

Telehit Awards

UK Music Video Awards

World Music Awards
The World Music Awards is an annual international awards show founded in 1989 that honours recording artists based on worldwide sales figures provided by the International Federation of the Phonographic Industry (IFPI). Sia has been nominated four times.

World Soundtrack Awards
The World Soundtrack Awards are presented by World Soundtrack Academy to honour accomplishment in film music. Sia has been nominated once.

|-
!scope="row"| 2017
| "Never Give Up"
| Best Original Song Written Directly for a Film
| 
|}

YouTube Music Awards
The YouTube Music Awards (commonly abbreviated as a YTMA) is an awards show presented by YouTube to honor the best in the music video medium. Sia has received two awards from two nominations.

Other recognition
In March 2021, a laneway in Adelaide city centre was renamed Sia Furler Lane, in her honour. The lane runs off Morphett Street and parallel to Hindley Street, near the former Cargo Club building (since demolished). A large mural titled She Imagined Buttons was painted on a wall nearby by local artist Jasmine Crisp, which is intended to reflect the response of a fan to Sia's 2011 performance in Adelaide. It one of a number of such renamings after musicians associated with the city, the others  being Paul Kelly, No Fixed Address, and Cold Chisel.

Footnotes

References

Sia
Awards and nominations